Fred Eames was an American three-cushion billiards  champion. In 1910 he defeated Alfredo de Oro for the Three-cushion Billiards World Champion title.

References

Three-cushion billiards players
American carom billiards players
World champions in three-cushion billiards
Year of birth missing
Year of death missing